Aedes cinereus is a mosquito species in the genus Aedes.

Distribution
The common range Aedes cinereus is in North America and Europe. Covering most of Canada, Alaska and Northern United States, and European counties of Belgium, Estonia, Germany, Ireland, Netherlands, Norway, Sweden and the United Kingdom.

References

External links
  New Jersey Mosquito Homepage, Characteristics, Bionomics, Medical Importance
  Bugguide, Photos
  GeoSpecies Database University of Wisconsin, Photos

cinereus
Insects described in 1818